Gennady Nikolayevich Shchekalo (Геннадий Николаевич Щекало, born ) is a Belarusian male former weightlifter, who competed in the 108 kg category and represented Belarus at international competitions. He won the bronze medal in the clean & jerk at the 1995 World Weightlifting Championships lifting 220.0 kg. He participated at the 1996 Summer Olympics in the 108 kg event.

References

External links
 

1968 births
Living people
Belarusian male weightlifters
World Weightlifting Championships medalists
Sportspeople from Minsk
Olympic weightlifters of Belarus
Weightlifters at the 1996 Summer Olympics
20th-century Belarusian people